The Crooked Letter is a 2004 fantasy novel by Sean Williams. It follows the story of Seth and Hadrian who have gone to Europe on holidays. Seth is murdered and they discover that Earth is just one of many realms.

Background
The Crooked Letter was first published in Australia on 30 June 2004 by Voyager in paperback format. It was later released in the United States in both hardcover and paperback in 2006 and 2008 respectively. The Crooked Letter is a prequel to William's earlier Books of the Change series and is the first of four books in The Books of the Cataclysm series. The Crooked Letter won the 2004 Aurealis Award for best fantasy novel and the 2005 Ditmar Award for best novel.

References

External links

2004 Australian novels
Australian fantasy novels
Aurealis Award-winning works
Voyager Books books